Tecrea Ltd is a biotech company located in the London Bioscience Innovation Centre. The company is involved in research and development to improve the cell and tissue delivery of drugs and reagents.  The approach involves nanomedicine, which has the potential to address a wide variety of diseases.

Recently Tecrea along with Cobra Biologics was awarded the Innovate UK Grant worth £112K to Develop AAV Scalable Production Bioprocess

Background
Founded in 2012, as a spinout from the Royal Veterinary College, University of London, the company has developed a line of tools aimed at improving scientific experiments through enhanced delivery of a range of molecules into cells.

Products
Tecrea Research Reagents and Drug Formulation products

Research Reagents

Transfection - Plasmid | siRNA 
HappyFect
When mixed with DNA or RNA, HappyFect forms nanoparticles that enable efficient transfection with low toxicity 
There are two types of HappyFect:
 HappyFect-PLASMID  
 HappyFect-RNAi

Drug Delivery - Peptide & Protein | Small Molecule 
Nanocargo

Tecrea’s NanoCargo products are aimed at improving the delivery of small molecules, peptides, and proteins, including antibodies, into a range of cell types and tissues. Nanocargo can also deliver cargo molecules into gram negative and gram positive bacteria.
There are two types of Nanocargo:
 Nanocargo-PRO 
 Nanocargo-SM

Sterility Maintenance 
Antimicrobial - SanZone
SanZone is used to ensure that incubators and water baths remain clean and infection-free. When culturing cells of any type, it is imperative that incubators be effectively sterile areas. The presence of SanZone kills microbes and prevents infection from accumulating in water baths and incubators.

Drug Formulation

Nanocin
Nanocin is a new platform for nanoparticle-based delivery of small molecules that can be applied to small molecule reagents, drugs and diagnostic probes.

References

External links

Biotechnology companies of the United Kingdom
2012 establishments in England
Biotechnology companies established in 2012